Pasquet is a surname. Notable people with the surname include:

Alix Pasquet (1919–1958), Haitian pilot, soccer player, and political revolutionary
Isabelle Pasquet (born 1962), French Senator
Nicolás Pasquet (born 1958), Uruguayan conductor
Ope Pasquet (born 1955), Uruguayan politician and lawyer